Castellammare del Golfo (or ) is a town and municipality in the Trapani Province of Sicily. The name can be translated as "Sea Fortress on the Gulf", stemming from the medieval fortress in the harbor. The nearby body of water conversely takes its name from the town, and is known as Gulf of Castellammare.

Heading upwards from its marina/harbour called "Cala Marina", with many restaurants and bars, the urban plan is made of steps and winding streets that lead to Piazza Petrolo in one direction or towards the main central gardens, where the town center lies with many shops, cafes and restaurants. The main street is called Corso Garibaldi.
Castellammare del Golfo has been described as probably having the most beautiful peninsula in all of Sicily.

History 
According to the opinion of historians and geographers such as Ptolemy,  Diodorus Siculus and Strabo, Castellammare del Golfo was born as Emporium Segestanorum, port of Segesta, a nearby city which shared the same ordeals until its fall. The Arabs Invaded Castellammare del Golfo from 827 AD, and called it "Al Madarig", which means "The Steps", probably due to an uphill steep street leading from the harbour to the area of the fortified bastion. It was the Arabs who first built the castle fortress, later enlarged by the Normans. The building rose on a rocky outcrop near the sea, linked to the mainland by a wooden drawbridge.

Fishing has been important in Castellammare del Golfo since ancient times. Today the town's economy continues to be based on fishing with the addition of tourism.

The small town is also noted for having been the birthplace of many Sicilian-American Mafia figures, including Sebastiano DiGaetano, Salvatore Maranzano, Stefano Magaddino, Vito Bonventre, John Tartamella, and Joseph Bonanno. This is the origin of the Castellamarese war, fought by the Masseria clan against the Maranzano clan for control of the Underworld in New York City. During the height of Italian immigration to the United States, many residents from Castellammare del Golfo immigrated to New York City, and settled on Elizabeth Street in Little Italy,  Italian Harlem, and Bushwick, Carroll Gardens and East New York neighborhoods of Brooklyn, New York.

After World War II, many residents from Castellammare del Golfo continued to immigrate to New York City, this time, settling in the Gravesend, Bensonhurst and Dyker Heights neighborhoods of Brooklyn, New York as well as the Ridgewood and Middle Village neighborhoods of Queens, New York, the Morris Park section of the Bronx, New York and all throughout the borough of Staten Island.

In the past decades Castellammare del Golfo has become an important tourist location as it is conveniently situated between Palermo and Trapani.

Nearby places 

Nearby places include Segesta, with its Doric temple and an amphitheater where performances are still held.

 Trapani about 35 km to the west;
 Palermo about 30 km to the east;
 Scopello with its tonnara (traditional tuna fishing ground) to the west;
 San Vito Lo Capo to the west;
 Riserva naturale dello Zingaro also to the west, with its bay beaches only accessible on foot or boat;

From Castellammare del Golfo you can take a boat trip departing from Cala Marina to the Egadi Islands situated in front of Trapani.

Films 

Castellammare del Golfo has also been a location for various films, including:
 For the Love of Mariastella (1946)
 Ocean's Twelve
 Avenging Angelo
 My name is Tanino
 Cefalonia (TV series)
 Inspector Montalbano, episode "The Sense of Touch"
 Largo Winch
 Leaves of the Tree

People
Joseph Bonanno, crime boss, historical leader of the Bonanno crime family
Vito Bonventre, New York City mobster
Stefano Magaddino, crime boss of the Buffalo crime family
Salvatore Maranzano, mobster, founder of the Bonanno crime family

See also
Castello Normanno Lighthouse

References

External links
 
 Castellammare's Official Website

Municipalities of the Province of Trapani
Populated coastal places in Italy